Pavle Šafarik (15 April 1846 –  1873) was a Serbian military officer, an artillery officer in the Serbian Army, and publisher. Born on 15 April 1846 in Belgrade, Principality of Serbia, Pavle was the son of the academic Janko Šafarik (1814–1876).  After finishing primary school and seven grades of gymnasium, he enrolled in the Military Academy in Belgrade in 1861. In 1871–72, he joined the Serb revolutionary organization known as the Main Board for Serb Liberation, based in Kragujevac. At that time, he was an officer at the artillery administration. In March 1873, he co-founded the Kragujevac Social Press.

References

Sources
 
 

1846 births
Year of death missing
19th-century Serbian people
Serbian publishers (people)
Military personnel from Belgrade
Serbian people of Slovak descent
19th-century military personnel